Milton H. Graham (March 23, 1919 – August 25, 2006) was an American politician. He served as mayor of Phoenix, Arizona from 1964 to 1970. A veteran of World War II, he was a water softening equipment distributor.

References

1919 births
2006 deaths
Mayors of Phoenix, Arizona
20th-century American politicians
American military personnel of World War II